John Robert Le Lievre (9 June 1956 – 23 May 2021) was an English professional squash player.

Le Lievre was born in Saint Peter Port, Guernsey on 9 June 1956 and was an English international, winning 16 caps between 1977 and 1982. He represented England during the 1981 World Team Squash Championships. In 1983, he was elected Chairman of the International Squash Players' Association.

References

External links
 

English male squash players
1956 births
2021 deaths
People from Saint Peter Port